Santuri is a community development block (CD block) that forms an administrative division in the Raghunathpur subdivision of the Purulia district in the Indian state of West Bengal.

History

Background
The Jaina Bhagavati-Sutra of the 5th century AD mentions that Purulia was one of the sixteen Mahajanapadas and was a part of the kingdom known as Vajra-bhumi in ancient times. In 1833, the Manbhum district was carved out of the Jungle Mahals district, with headquarters at Manbazar. In 1838, the headquarters was transferred to Purulia. After independence, when Manbhum district was a part of Bihar, efforts were made to impose Hindi on the Bengali-speaking majority of the district and it led to the Bengali Language Movement (Manbhum). In 1956, the Manbhum district was partitioned between Bihar and West Bengal under the States Reorganization Act and the Bihar and West Bengal (Transfer of Territories) Act 1956.

Geography

The Santuri CD block is located in the north-eastern part of the district. The Damodar marks the northern boundary of the CD block. The Damodar Dwaraka upland is an extension of the Chota Nagpur Plateau. The area is undulating with hillocks of hard rocks.

The Santuri CD block is bounded by the Asansol Municipal Corporation, in the Paschim Bardhaman district, across the Damodar River on the north, the Saltora CD block, in the Bankura district, on the east, the Kashipur CD block on the south and the Raghunathpur I and Neturia CD blocks on the west.

Santuri CD block has an area of 179.69 km2. It has 1 panchayat samity, 6 gram panchayats, 57 gram sansads (village councils), 104 mouzas, 92 inhabited villages and 1 census town. Santuri police station serves this block. Headquarters of this CD block was at Muraddi. which had now been shifted to Talberia in a newly set up establishment since 14-02-2006.

Gram panchayats in the Santuri CD block/panchayat samiti are: Balitora, Gariska, Muraddi, Ramchandrapur-Kotaldih, Santuri and Tarbari.

Demographics

Population
According to the 2011 Census of India, Santuri CD block had a total population of 78,515, of which 72,586 were rural and 5,929 were urban. There were 40,085 (51%) males and 38,430 (49%) females. There were 10,584 persons in the age range of 0 to 6 years. The Scheduled Castes numbered 20,091 (25.59%) and the Scheduled Tribes numbered 25,083 (31.95%).

According to the 2001 census, the Santuri CD block had a total population of 69,546, out of which 35,839 were males and 33,707 were females. The Santuri CD block registered a population growth of 9.36 per cent during the 1991-2001 decade. Decadal growth for the Purulia district was 13.96 per cent. Decadal growth in West Bengal was 17.84 per cent.

Census towns in the Santuri CD block are (2011 census figures in brackets): Murulia (5,929).

Villages in the Santuri CD block are (2011 census figures in brackets): Santuri (2,700), Muraddi (2,321), Gorsika (1,741), Tarabari (1,772), Ramchandrapur (2,648), Kotaldih (1,663) and Balora (3,206).

Literacy
According to the 2011 census the total number of literate persons in the Santuri CD block was 43,604 (64.15% of the population over 6 years) out of which males numbered 26,495 (76.32% of the male population over 6 years) and females numbered 17,109 (51.45%) of the female population over 6 years). The gender disparity (the difference between female and male literacy rates) was 24.87%.

See also – List of West Bengal districts ranked by literacy rate

Language and religion
In the 2001 census, Bengali was the mother tongue for 76.6% of the population of the district, followed by Santali 11.4%, Kurmali Thar 7.7%, Hindi 1.9%, Urdu 1.1%, Khortha/ Khotta 0.3%, Telugu 0.2%, Odia 0.1%, Mundari 0.1% and other languages 0.4%.

There is a tribal presence in many of the CD blocks of the district. Santali was spoken by around 14% of the population of the earlier Manbhum district. Some people also speak Mundari or Kolarian languages such as Kurmali, Mundari and the languages of the Bhumij or Mahli communities.

The West Bengal Official Language (Second Amendment) Bill, 2012, included Hindi, Santhali, Odiya and Punjabi as official languages  if it is spoken by a population exceeding 10 per cent of the whole in a particular block or sub-division or a district.  Subsequently, Kamtapuri, Rajbanshi and Kurmali were also included in the list of minority languages by the West Bengal Official Language (Second Amendment) Bill, 2018. However, as of 2020, there is no official / other reliable information about the areas covered.

In the 2011 census, Hindus numbered 55,510 and formed 70.71% of the population in the Santuri CD block. Muslims numbered 6,282 and formed 8.00% of the population. Christians numbered 208 and formed 0.26% of the population. Others numbered  16,515 and formed 21.03% of the population. Others include Addi Bassi, Marang Boro, Santal, Saranath, Sari Dharma, Sarna, Alchchi, Bidin, Sant, Saevdharm, Seran, Saran, Sarin, Kheria, and other religious communities.

Rural Poverty
According to the Rural Household Survey in 2005, 32.85% of total number of families were BPL families in Purulia district. According to a World Bank report, as of 2012, 31-38% of the population in Purulia, Murshidabad and Uttar Dinajpur districts were below poverty level, the highest among the districts of West Bengal, which had an average 20% of the population below poverty line.

Economy

Livelihood

In the Santuri CD block in 2011, among the class of total workers, cultivators numbered 6,274 and formed 21.28%, agricultural labourers numbered 9,837 and formed 33.36%, household industry workers numbered  994 and formed 3.37% and other workers numbered 12,378 and formed 41.98%. Total workers numbered 29,483 and formed 37.55% of the total population, and non-workers numbered 49,032 and formed 62.45% of the population.

Note: In the census records a person is considered a cultivator, if the person is engaged in cultivation/ supervision of land owned by self/government/institution. When a person who works on another person's land for wages in cash or kind or share, is regarded as an agricultural labourer. Household industry is defined as an industry conducted by one or more members of the family within the household or village, and one that does not qualify for registration as a factory under the Factories Act. Other workers are persons engaged in some economic activity other than cultivators, agricultural labourers and household workers.  It includes factory, mining, plantation, transport and office workers, those engaged in business and commerce, teachers, entertainment artistes and so on.

Infrastructure
There are 92 inhabited villages in the Santuri CD block, as per the District Census Handbook, Puruliya, 2011, 100% villages have power supply. 100% villages have drinking water supply. 19 villages (20.65%) have post offices. 83 villages (90.22%) have telephones (including landlines, public call offices and mobile phones). 36 villages (39.13%) have pucca (paved) approach roads and 44 villages (47.83%) have transport communication (includes bus service, rail facility and navigable waterways). 2 villages (2.17%) have agricultural credit societies and 8 villages (8.70%) have banks.

Industry
There is a cement plant, Damodhar Cement Works, owned by ACC Ltd. at Madhukunda.

Other industries in Santuri CD block are: Mark Steel Private Ltd. in Jagannathdihi, Vision Sponge Iron at Madhukunda.

Agriculture
In 2013-14, persons engaged in agriculture in the Santuri CD block could be classified as follows: bargadars 3.73%, patta (document) holders 20.87%, small farmers (possessing land between 1 and 2 hectares) 2.77%, marginal farmers (possessing land up to 1 hectare) 30.70% and agricultural labourers 41.93%.

In 2013-14, the total area irrigated in the Santuri CD block was 12,154.1 hectares, out of which 4,117.16 hectares by canal water, 6,747.47 hectares by tank water, 20.59 hectares by river lift irrigation, 147.80 hectares by open dug wells and 1,121.10 hectares by other means.

In 2013-14, the Santuri CD block produced 3,001 tonnes of Aman paddy, the main winter crop, from 1,542 hectares. It also produced wheat, mustard and potatoes.

Banking
In 2013-14, the Santuri CD block had offices of 3 commercial banks and 2 gramin banks.

Backward Regions Grant Fund
The Purulia district is listed as a backward region and receives financial support from the Backward Regions Grant Fund. The fund, created by the Government of India, is designed to redress regional imbalances in development. As of 2012, 272 districts across the country were listed under this scheme. The list includes 11 districts of West Bengal.

Transport

In 2013-14, the Santuri CD block had 3 originating/ terminating bus routes.

State Highway 8 running from Santaldih (in the Purulia district) to Majhdia (in the Nadia district) passes through this CD block.

The Asansol-Adra line of the South Eastern Railway passes through this block and there are stations at Madhukunda and Muradi.

Education
In 2013-14, the Santuri CD block had 89 primary schools with 6,682 students, 13 middle schools with 999 students, 6 high schools with 2,321 students and 6 higher secondary schools with 4,601 students. Santuri CD Block had 176 institutions with 4,230 students for special and non-formal education.

See also – Education in India

According to the 2011 census, in Santuri CD block, amongst the 92 inhabited villages, 13 villages did not have a school, 18 villages had two or more  primary schools, 24 villages had at least 1 primary and 1 middle school and 17 villages had at least 1 middle and 1 secondary school.

Healthcare
In 2014, the Santuri CD block had 1 block primary health centre, 2 primary health centres and 1 private nursing home, with total 296 beds and 24 doctors. 13,260 patients were treated indoor and 216,626 patients were treated outdoor in the health centres and subcentres of the CD block.

Muraddi Rural Hospital, with 30 beds at Muraddi, is the major government medical facility in the Santuri CD block. Among the other medical facilities are the Balitora Block Primary Health Centre, with 10 beds and a primary health centre, with 10 beds, at Santuri.

External links

References

Community development blocks in Purulia district